The 4th Richmond Trophy was a non-championship Formula One motor race held at the Goodwood Circuit on 14 April 1952. The race was won by José Froilán González in a Ferrari 375, setting fastest lap in the process. Mike Hawthorn in a Cooper T20-Bristol was second and Duncan Hamilton third in a Talbot-Lago T26C.

Results

References

Richmond Trophy
Richmond Trophy
Richmond Trophy